Francis Patrick Vincent McManus  (27 February 190528 December 1983), Australian politician, was the last leader of the parliamentary Democratic Labor Party and a prominent figure in Australian politics for 30 years.

Early life

McManus was born in North Melbourne, into a working-class family of Irish Catholic background. He was one of three boys to Patrick, a wagon driver and Gertrude his wife. He was educated at Christian Brothers schools, including St Mary's Primary School, West Melbourne, St. Joseph's, CBC North Melbourne (1918–1922), and St Kevin's College, Melbourne. Following his secondary schooling, and with the assistance of a scholarship, he attended Newman College at the University of Melbourne where he graduated with a Bachelor of Arts(Honors) and Diploma of Education which allowed him to become a school teacher. Later he became an official in the Victorian Department of Education.

Political life

In 1950 McManus was appointed Assistant State Secretary of the Australian Labor Party. The Victorian Branch of the party was then under the control of right-wing forces aligned with B. A. Santamaria's secretive anti-communist "Movement." In this position McManus supported the Industrial Groups which the party had set up within trade unions to combat the influence of the Communist Party of Australia.

After Labor's defeat in the 1954 federal election, the federal Leader, Dr H. V. Evatt, publicly blamed the Victorian Branch and Santamaria's "Movement" for the defeat, causing a split in the Branch between pro- and anti-Evatt factions which eventually split the whole party. McManus along with hundreds of other "Groupers" was expelled from Labor. They formed the Australian Labor Party (Anti-Communist), which eventually became the Democratic Labor Party (DLP).

At the 1970 election, campaigning on the slogan "Vote Mac Back", he polled 19.1 percent, the DLP's best-ever result. 

In the Senate, the DLP had between one and five Senators between 1955 and 1974, led first by George Cole of Tasmania and then by Vince Gair of Queensland, with McManus as Deputy Leader. The DLP gave critical support to the Liberal governments of Robert Menzies and his successors, pressing them to adopt more militantly anti-communist policies both domestically and internationally, particularly on issues such as the Vietnam War and the recognition of the People's Republic of China believing there was a real threat from communist domination. They also supported conservative Catholic views on social issues. On some issues, such as pensions, the DLP supported traditional Labor policies.

In 1973, following the election of the Whitlam Labor government, Gair was forced out as DLP Leader and was succeeded by McManus, who at 68 was only three years younger than Gair. The election of Whitlam had robbed the DLP of most of its influence, and Gair's acceptance of the post of Ambassador to Ireland from Whitlam split the party and caused a collapse in its support. In 1974 the DLP supported the Liberal leader, Billy Snedden, in threatening to block the Whitlam government's budget bills in the Senate.

When Whitlam responded by immediately calling an election for both the House and Senate (a double dissolution), McManus informed the Victorian Central Executive that Billy Snedden had agreed to the Liberals running a joint Senate ticket with the DLP, which would have guaranteed him a winnable Senate spot. But this joint ticket did not eventuate, and all the DLP Senators lost their seats, McManus polling only 6.4 percent in Victoria.

Later life

McManus ran for the Senate again at the 1975 election following the fall of the Whitlam government, but was not elected, his vote falling to 5.8 percent. In 1976 he resigned as leader and the party was wound up in 1978.

He was made a Companion of the Order of St Michael and St George (CMG) in 1979.

He died in Melbourne in 1983 leaving a wife and four children.

References

Further reading

1905 births
1983 deaths
Democratic Labour Party members of the Parliament of Australia
Members of the Australian Senate
Members of the Australian Senate for Victoria
Politicians from Melbourne
20th-century Australian politicians
Australian anti-communists
Australian Companions of the Order of St Michael and St George
People from North Melbourne
Australian people of Irish descent
People educated at St Kevin's College, Melbourne
People educated at St Joseph's College, Melbourne
University of Melbourne alumni